Elbeuf is a commune in the Seine-Maritime department in the Normandy region in northern France.

Geography
The commune's territory is largely residential to the north but the southern section is covered by thick woodland. Its position by a meander of the Seine leaves the town susceptible to flooding.

History
The first written record of the town was in the 10th century, on a map of Richard I of Normandy, under the name "Wellebou". It passed into the hands of the houses of Rieux and Lorraine, and was raised to the rank of a duchy in the peerage of France by Henry III in favour of Charles de Lorraine. The last duke of Elbeuf was Charles Eugène of Lorraine.

Heraldry

Population

Places of interest
 The mairie, also housing the museum.
 Two seventeenth-century churches.
 Some sixteenth-century houses.
Elbeuf corp headquarters.
 A fifteenth-century stone cross.
 The theatre (1890), renovated in the late twentieth century.

Notable people
 Raoul Grimoin-Sanson, cinematography inventor, was born here.
 André Maurois (né Émile Salomon Wilhelm Herzog), novelist, member of the Académie française
 David Vigor was born here and was a member of the Australian Senate, representing the Australian Democrats and the Unite Australia Party

Twin towns
 Lingen, Germany

See also

List of rulers of Elbeuf
Communes of the Seine-Maritime department

References

External links

Official Elbeuf website 
Website of the Communauté d'Agglomération d'Elbeuf 
Website of the parish of Elbeuf 
Elbeuf on the Quid website 

Communes of Seine-Maritime
Dukes of Elbeuf
Marquesses of Elbeuf